Nanno can refer to:
Nanno, a municipality in the province of Trento in Italy
Nannō, Gifu, a town in Japan
Yoko Minamino, whose nickname is "Nanno". Also several of her albums are named "Nanno".
Yōkō Minamino, a fictional character from the manga series Shonan Junai Gumi, whose nickname is "Nanno"
Nanno (Ναννώ), a female flute player described in several poems of Mimnermus, a Greek elegiac poet 
Nanno Nanigashi, an archaic form of the Japanese equivalent of John Doe
Nanno de Groot, an artist known for abstract expressionism
Nanno (cephalopod), a genus of prehistoric cephalopod

See also 
 Nano